Brandi Ahzionae is an activist and advocate for transgender rights in Washington, DC. She started the blog DMV Trans Circulator, which aims to build a community of positive transgender people. Professionally, Ahzionae also works as a hair stylist.

External links 
 DMV Trans Circulator

References 

Activists from Washington, D.C.
Hairdressers
Transgender rights activists
Living people
Year of birth missing (living people)